The People's Republic of China competed at the 1984 Summer Olympics in Los Angeles, United States.
It was the first appearance at the Summer Games for the country after its mostly symbolic presence at the Summer Games in 1952 during which the dispute between the Republic of China and the PRC resulted in the former withdrawing all its athletes. After 1952 and until these games, the PRC boycotted the Olympics due to the Taiwan's presence as the Republic of China. In 1984, the Republic of China competed as Chinese Taipei and the PRC competed as China. Due to the then ongoing Sino-Soviet split, China did not participate in the Soviet-led boycott. In the previous games, China participated the United States-led boycott to protest the Soviet invasion of Afghanistan in 1979, becoming the only communist country to boycott Olympics held by another communist country (Soviet Union).

215 competitors, 132 men and 83 women, took part in 105 events in 19 sports. The first gold medal to be awarded at the Los Angeles Olympics was also the first-ever medal to be won by an athlete from China when Xu Haifeng won the 50 m Pistol event. Li Ning won also 6 medals in gymnastics, 3 gold, 2 silver, and 1 bronze, earning him the nickname "Prince of Gymnasts" in China.

Medalists

The following Chinese. competitors won medals at the games. In the by discipline sections below, medalists' names are bolded.

Gold
Xu Haifeng
Zeng Guoqiang
Wu Shude
Li Yuwei
Chen Weiqiang
Yao Jingyuan
Wu Xiaoxuan
Luan Jujie
Li Ning (3)
Lou Yun
Ma Yanhong
Volleyball, Women's team competition (Hou Yuzhu, Jiang Ying, Lang Ping, Li Yanjun, Liang Yan, Su Huijuan, Yang Xiaojun, Yang Xilan, Zhang Rongfang, Zheng Meizhu, Zhou Xiaolan, and Zhu Ling)
Zhou Jihong.

Silver
Li Lingjuan
Tan Liangde
Zhou Peishun
Lai Runming
Tong Fei
Men's gymnastics team (Lou Yun, Tong Fei, Li Ning, Xu Zhiqiang, Li Xiaoping, Li Yuejiu, Zou Limin)
Li Ning
Lou Yun

Bronze
Zhu Jianhua
Li Kongzheng
Li Ning
Huang Shiping
Wang Yifu
Wu Xiaoxuan
Women's Gymnastics Team (Ma Yanhong, Zhou Qiurui, Zhou Ping, Chen Yongyan, Huang Qun, Wu Jiani, and Ming Guixiu)
Women's Basketball Team Competition (Song Xiaobo, Lijuan Xiu, Chen Yuefang, Zheng Haixia, Qiu Chen, Li Xiaoqin, Zhang Hui,  Cong Xuedi,   Zhang Yueqin, Ba Yan,  Wang Jun, and  Liu Qing)
Women's Handball Team (Wu Xinjiang, Liu Yumei, Chen Jing, Zhang Weihong, Gao Xiumin, Wang Linwei, Liu Liping, Zhang Peijun, Sun Xiulan, Li Lan, Wang Mingxing, Chen Zheng, Guo Yingze, He Jianping, and Zhu Juefeng).

Archery

The PRC sent six archers to the Olympics. The women's team was more successful than the men's, earning a silver medal and an additional top eight finish.

Women's Individual Competition:
Li Lingjuan - 2559 points (→  Silver Medal)
Wu Yanan - 2493 points (→ 8th place)
Wang Jin - 2445 points (→ 18th place)

Men's Individual Competition:
Yong Shan - 2483 points (→ 18th place)
Zhang Zheng - 2405 points (→ 36th place)
Feng Zemin - 2389 points (→ 38th place)

Athletics

Men's Competition
Men's 100 metres
 Yu Zhuanghui

Men's 200 metres
 Yu Zhuanghui

Men's 110 metres Hurdles
 Yu Zhicheng
 Li Jieqiang

Men's 20 km Walk
 Zhang Fuxin
 Final — 1:32:10 (→ 27th place)

Men's 50 km Walk
 Zhang Fuxin
 Final — 4:23:39 (→ 15th place)

Men's High Jump
 Zhu Jianhua
 Qualification — 2.24m
 Final — 2.31m (→  Bronze Medal)
 Liu Yunpeng
 Qualification — 2.24m
 Final — 2.29m (→ 7th place)
 Cai Shu
 Qualification — 2.24m
 Final — 2.27m (→ 8th place)

Men's Long Jump
 Liu Yuhuang
 Qualification — 7.83m
 Final — 7.99m (→ 5th place)
 Wang Shijie
 Qualification — 7.36m (→ did not advance, 18th place)

Men's Triple Jump
 Zou Zhenxian
 Final — 16.83m (→ 4th place)

Men's Pole Vault
 Yang Weimin
 Qualifying Round — 5.30m 
 Final — 5.10m (→ 10th place)
 Ji Zebiao
 Qualifying Round — 5.10m (→ did not advance)

Men's Decathlon 
 Weng Kangqiang 
 Final Result — 7662 points (→ 15th place)

Women's Competition
Women's 100 metres Hurdles
Liu Huajin

Women's High Jump 
 Zheng Dazhen 
 Qualification — 1.90 m 
 Final — 1.91 m (→ 7th place)
 Yang Wenqin 
 Qualification — 1.90 m 
 Final — 1.88 m (→ 9th place)
 Ge Ping 
 Qualification — 1.84 m (→ did not advance, 21st place)

Women's Long Jump
Liao Wenfen
 Qualification — 6.16 m (→ did not advance, 15th place)

Women's Discus Throw 
 Jiao Yunxiang 
 Qualification — 54.70 m
 Final — 53.32 m (→ 11th place)

Women's Shot Put
 Li Meisu 
 Final — 17.96 m (→ 5th place)
 Yang Yanqin 
 Final — 16.97 m (→ 10th place)

Women's Javelin Throw 
 Zhu Hongyang 
 Qualification — 53.18 m (→ did not advance)

Basketball

Men's Team Competition
Preliminary Round (Group B)
Lost to United States (49-97)
Defeated France (85-83)
Lost to Canada (80-121)
Lost to Spain (83-102)
Lost to Uruguay (67-74)
Classification Matches
9th/12th place: Defeated Egypt (76-73)
9th/10th place: Lost to Brazil (76-86) → Tenth place
Team Roster
Wang Haibo
Lü Jinqing
Huang Yunlong
Guo Yonglin
Kuang Lubin
Ji Zhaoguang
Li Yaguang
Sun Fengwu
Wang Libin
Liu Jianli
Hu Zhangbao
Zhang Bin

Women's Team Competition
Preliminary Round
Defeated Australia (67-64)
Lost to Canada (61-66)
Defeated Yugoslavia (79-58)
Lost to United States (55-91)
Lost to South Korea (56-69)
Bronze Medal Match
Defeated Canada (62-57) →  Bronze Medal
Team Roster
Ba Yan 
Chen Yuefang  
Cong Xuedi  
Liu Qing  
Li Xiaoqin   
Qiu Chen   
Song Xiaobo   
Wang Jun   
Xiu Lijuan   
Zhang Hui   
Zhang Yueqin 
Zheng Haixia

Canoeing

Cycling

Seven cyclists, four men and three women, represented China in 1984.

Team time trial
 Han Shuxiang, Liu Fu, Wang Wanqiang, and Zeng Bo — 21st place

Women's individual road race
 Lu Suyan — 31st place
 Wang Li — 36th place
 Lu Yu'e — 41st place

Diving

Men's 3m Springboard
Tan Liangde
 Preliminary Round — 600.99
 Final — 662.31 (→  Silver Medal)
Li Hongping
 Preliminary Round — 611.55
 Final — 646.35 (→ 4th place)

Men's 10m Platform
Li Kongzheng
 Final  ( Bronze Medal)

Fencing

18 fencers, 13 men and 5 women, represented China in 1984.

Men's foil
 Liu Yunhong
 Chu Shisheng
 Yu Yifeng

Men's team foil
 Chu Shisheng, Cui Yining, Yu Yifeng, Wang Wei, Zhang Jian, Liu Yunhong

Men's épée
 Cui Yining
 Zhao Zhizhong
 Zong Xiangqing

Men's team épée
 Cui Yining, Pang Jin, Zhao Zhizhong, Zong Xiangqing

Men's sabre
 Chen Jinchu
 Wang Ruiji
 Liu Guozhen

Men's team sabre
 Wang Ruiji, Chen Jinchu, Yang Shisen, Liu Guozhen, Liu Yunhong

Women's foil
 Jujie Luan
 Zhu Qingyuan
 Li Huahua

Women's team foil
 Jujie Luan, Zhu Qingyuan, Li Huahua, Wu Qiuhua, Zhu Minzhu

Gymnastics

Men
Lou Yun — Vault,  Gold Medal
Li Ning — Floor Exercise, Pommel Horse, Rings,  Gold Medals; Vault,  Silver Medal; All-Around,  Bronze Medal 
 Tong Fei — Horizontal Bar,  Silver Medal

Women
Ma Yanhong — Uneven Bars,  Gold Medal

Handball

Women's Team Competition
Preliminary Round Robin
Lost to the United States (22-25)
Defeated West Germany (20-19)
Tied with South Korea (24-24)
Defeated Austria (21-16)
Lost to Yugoslavia (25-31) →  Bronze Medal
Team Roster
Wu Xingjiang
He Jianping
Zhu Juefeng
Zhang Weihong
Gao Xiumin
Wang Linwei
Liu Liping
Sun Xiulan
Liu Yumei
Li Lan
Wang Mingxing
Chen Zhen

Judo

Rhythmic gymnastics

Rowing

Sailing

Shooting

Swimming

Men's 100m Freestyle 
Mu Lati
 Heat — 52.82 (→ did not advance, 31st place)
Shen Jianqiang
 Heat — 52.84 (→ did not advance, 32nd place)

Men's 200m Freestyle
Shen Jianqiang
 Heat — 1:56.08 (→ did not advance, 34th place)

Men's 100m Backstroke 
Wang Hao
 Heat — 59.13 (→ did not advance, 23rd place)
Li Zhongyi
 Heat — 1:00.66 (→ did not advance, 30th place)

Men's 200m Backstroke 
Wang Hao
 Heat — 2:12.28 (→ did not advance, 28th place)

Men's 100m Breaststroke
Jin Fu
 Heat — 1:05.05 (→ did not advance, 17th place)
Wang Lin
 Heat — DSQ (→ did not advance, no ranking)

Men's 200m Breaststroke
Jin Fu
 Heat — 2:26.?? (→ did not advance, 26th place)

Men's 100m Butterfly
Zheng Jian
 Heat — 56.58 (→ did not advance, 26th place)

Men's 200m Individual Medley
Chen Qin
 Heat — 2:10.30 (→ did not advance, 24th place)
Feng Dawei
 Heat — 2:11.30 (→ did not advance, 25th place)

Men's 4 × 100 m Freestyle Relay 
Mu Lati, Feng Dawei, Chen Qin, and Shen Jianqiang
 Heat — 3:30.82 (→ did not advance, 15th place)

Men's 4 × 100 m Medley Relay
Wang Hao, Jin Fu, Zheng Jian, and Mu Lati
 Heat — 3:51.71 (→ did not advance, 11th place)

Women's 100m Freestyle
Ding Jilian
 Heat — 59.11 (→ did not advance, 22nd place)

Women's 100m Backstroke
 Guo Huaying
 Heat — 1:08.21 (→ did not advance, 25th place)

Women's 200m Backstroke
Yan Hong
 Heat — 2:32.33 (→ did not advance, 26th place)

Women's 200m Individual Medley
Yan Hong
 Heat — 2:27.95 (→ did not advance, 21st place)

Women's 4x100 Medley Relay
Guo Huaying, Liang Weifen, Li Jinlan, and Ding Jilian
 Heat — 4:27.39 (→ did not advance)

Volleyball

Men's Team Competition
Preliminary Round (Group B)
 Lost to Japan (0-3)
 Lost to Italy (0-3)
 Defeated Egypt (3-0)
 Lost to Canada (0-3)
Classification Matches
 5th/8th place: Lost to South Korea (1-3)
 7th/8th place: Lost to Japan (0-3) → 8th place
Team Roster
 Yan Jianming
 Song Jinwei
 Yu Juekin
 Zhai Jixin
 Zhang Yousheng
 Zhao Duo 
 Yang Liqun
 Cao Ping 
 Shen Keqin
 Zuo Yue
 Xiao Jinsong
 Liu Changcheng

Women's Team Competition
Preliminary Round (Group B)
 Defeated Brazil (3-0)
 Defeated West Germany (3-0)
 Lost to United States (1-3)
Semi Finals
 Defeated Japan (3-0)
Final
 Defeated United States (3-1) →  Gold Medal

Water polo

Men's Team Competition
Preliminary Round (Group A)
 Lost to Netherlands (8-10)
 Lost to Yugoslavia (7-12)
 Defeated Canada (6-5)
Final Round (Group E)
 Defeated Japan (10-4)
 Lost to Italy (8-11)
 Defeated Brazil (11-9)
 Lost to Greece (9-10) → 9th place
Team Roster
 Deng Jun
 Wang Xiaotian
 Song Weigang
 Li Jianming
 Huang Ying
 Cai Tianxiong
 Qu Baowei
 Zhao Bilong
 Chen Zhixiong
 Cai Shengliu
 Pan Shenghua
 Huang Long
 Guan Shishi

Weightlifting

Wrestling

References

Nations at the 1984 Summer Olympics
1984
Summer Olympics